F-star Biotechnology Ltd. is a biotechnology company, founded in Vienna in 2006, with a current main research site in Cambridge, UK. The company is focused in developing bispecific monoclonal antibodies using a modular combinatorial approach that engineers the Fc constant region of an immunoglobulin into a novel antigen-binding site.

See also

Biotechnology companies of the United Kingdom
Biotechnology companies established in 2006
2006 establishments in Austria